Santiago Genovés (31 December 1923 – 5 September 2013) was a Spanish-born Mexican anthropologist who was affiliated with the National Autonomous University of Mexico. He is known for designing the 1973 "Peace Project" experiment, in which he and ten other people (four men and six women) aimed to sail on the Acali raft from the Canary Islands to Mexico. He hoped that this experiment would shed light on the causes of violence in humans and on how it could be prevented. The 101-day experiment, frequently dubbed the "Sex Raft" by the media, was the subject of the 2018 documentary film The Raft, by Marcus Lindeen. He was also one of the researchers who originated, co-authored and signed the Seville Statement on Violence in 1986.

Prior to the "Peace Project", Genovés had been part of the Thor Heyerdahl Ra expedition.

References

1923 births
2013 deaths
People from Ourense
Spanish emigrants to Mexico
Mexican anthropologists
National School of Anthropology and History alumni
Alumni of the University of Cambridge
Academic staff of the National Autonomous University of Mexico